Journey Into Love is an album by American jazz drummer Louis Bellson featuring performances recorded in 1954 for the Norgran label. The album is unique among Bellson's catalog as it features orchestral arrangements by Bellson and Buddy Baker of mood music and was also released as Two in Love under  Baker's name in 1956.

Reception
Allmusic awarded the album 3 stars.

Track listing
All compositions by Louis Bellson except as indicated
 "Lonesome" (Buddy Baker, Louis Bellson) 
 "Mirror on the Water" 
 "Javille" 
 "Can This Be True" (Baker, Bellson)
 "Unforgettable" (Irving Gordon)
 "Be My Pretty Flower"
 "Dancing on a Moonbeam"
 "Don't Be Afraid to Love Me" (Bellson, Pearl Bailey)
 "Out of This World" (Harold Arlen, Johnny Mercer)
 "Love Me Forever"

Personnel
Louis Bellson – drums, arranger
Juan Tizol - valve trombone
George Poole - flute
Willie Smith - alto saxophone
Ernie Hughes - piano
Unidentified string section arranged and conducted by Buddy Baker

References

Verve Records albums
Norgran Records albums
Louie Bellson albums
1955 albums
Albums produced by Norman Granz